Greg Stein (born March 16, 1967 in Portland, Oregon), living in Austin, Texas, United States,  is a programmer, speaker, sometime standards architect, and open-source software advocate, appearing frequently at conferences and in interviews on the topic of open-source software development and use.

He was a director of the Apache Software Foundation, and served as chairman from 21 August 2002 to 20 June 2007.  He is also a member of the Python Software Foundation, was a director there from 2001 to 2002, and a maintainer of the Python programming language and libraries (active from 1999 to 2002).

Stein has been especially active in version control systems development.  In the late 1990s and early 2000s, he helped develop the WebDAV HTTP versioning specification, and is the main author of mod_dav, the first open-source implementation of WebDAV.  He was one of the founding developers of the Subversion project, and is primarily responsible for Subversion's WebDav networking layer.

Stein most recently worked as an engineering manager at Google, where he helped launch Google's open-source hosting platform. Stein publicly announced his departure from Google via his blog on July 29, 2008. Prior to Google, he worked for Oracle Corporation, eShop, Microsoft, CollabNet, and as an independent developer.

Stein was a major contributor to the Lima Mudlib, a MUD server software framework.  His MUD community pseudonym was "Deathblade".

References

External links 

 Ask Apache Software Foundation Chairman Greg Stein (Slashdot article)
 Video interview at dev2dev
 Interview with Googles (sic) Greg Stein and Chris DiBona (Slashdot interview about the launch of Google's open-source code hosting platform)
 Apache's Greg Stein says commercial software's days are numbered (ComputerWorld / InfoWorld / MacWorld article)
 Highlights of Greg Stein’s keynote (A third-party summary of Stein's keynote at EclipseCon 2006)
 Homepage
 Google's Greg Stein InfoTalk on Open Source
 In Competitive Move, I.B.M. Puts Code in Public Domain (New York Times article on IBM's donation of WebSphere to the Apache Software Foundation)
 Greg Stein Interview podcast (with Leo Laporte and Randal Schwartz).
 "Trillions and Trillions Served" (hosted by Greg Stein, a feature documentary detailing ASF's history and far-reaching impact on the open-source software community)

American computer scientists
Free software programmers
Google employees
Oracle employees
Microsoft employees
MUD developers
Living people
1967 births
Python (programming language) people